Shanghai: Great Moments is a video game developed by Quicksilver Software and published by Activision for the PC. It is part of the Shanghai series.

Gameplay
Shanghai: Great Moments is an all-Windows remake of the puzzle game Shanghai.

Reception

Next Generation reviewed the PC version of the game, rating it four stars out of five, and stated that "Surely this game is destined to be a classic."

Reviews
PC Gamer Vol. 2 No. 7 (1995 July)
Computer Gaming World (Sep, 1995)
Entertainment Weekly - Apr 28, 1995
PC Games - Aug, 1995
All Game Guide - 1995

References

1995 video games
Activision games
Classic Mac OS games
Multiplayer and single-player video games
PlayStation (console) games
Puzzle video games
Quicksilver Software games
Sega Saturn games
Sunsoft games
Video games developed in the United States
Windows games